The Echinosteliales are an order of Amoebozoa in the class Myxomycetes. It contains two families, the Clastodermataceae and the Echinosteliaceae. Echinosteliales was circumscribed by George Willard Martin and published in 1961.

References

Myxogastria
Amoebozoa orders